Making It Australia is a reality competition television series co-hosted by comedians Susie Youssef and Harley Breen and based on the American series of the same name. The series premiered on Wednesday, 15 September 2021 on Network 10.

The show features craftspeople skilled in different media competing to be named the "Master Maker" and win A$100,000. Each week, competitors participate in two or three challenges – a "Faster Craft", a "Together Craft" and a "Master Craft." The winner of each challenge earns a patch. For the Faster Craft, makers have three hours to create an item. For the Together Craft, they a split into teams and work together to create a themed item. For the Master Craft, makers have eight hours to create a more elaborate themed collection. At the end of every episode, one person is sent home based on their performance in the Master Craft.

Production
In October 2020, Network 10 announced that they had commissioned a local version of the show at their annual upfronts. In March 2021, it was announced that Susie Youssef and Harley Breen would be co-hosting the series and that it would be judged by production designer and art director Deborah Riley and paper engineer Benja Harney.

Due to low viewership, the series was bumped from its primetime slot of Wednesday and Thursday nights and began airing on Saturday nights from its seventh episode. At the Network 10 upfronts in October 2021, it was announced that the series had been cancelled.

Cast

Hosts
Susie Youssef
Harley Breen

Judges
Deborah Riley
Benja Harney

Contestants

Contestant progress

 (FAST) The Contestant won that episode's Faster Craft Challenge.
 (TOGT) The Contestant's team won that episode's Together Craft Challenge.
 (WIN) The Contestant won that episode's Master Craft Challenge.
 (MEGA) The Contestant won that episode's Mega Craft Challenge.
 (BOTH) The Contestant won both that episode's Faster Craft Challenge and Master Craft Challenge.
 (OUT) The Contestant won that episode’s Faster Craft or Together Craft Challenge but was eliminated from the competition during the Master Craft Challenge.
 (OUT) The Contestant was eliminated from the competition.
 (WITH) The Contestant withdrew from the competition.
 (SAFE) The Contestant won neither the Faster Craft Challenge nor Master Craft Challenge, and they were not eliminated.
 (WINNER) The Contestant was named Master Maker.
 (WINNER) The Contestant won the Faster Craft Challenge and was then named Master Maker.
 (RUNNER UP) The contestant was runner-up.

Special guests
Tonia Todman – Episode 9

Season synopsis

See also

List of Australian television series
Making It (TV series)
Anh's Brush with Fame
The Great Australian Bake Off
The Mix

References

External links
 
 
 

Network 10 original programming
2020s Australian reality television series
2021 Australian television series debuts
2021 Australian television series endings
Arts and crafts television series
English-language television shows
Television shows set in Sydney
Australian television series based on American television series
Television series by Matchbox Pictures
Television series by Eureka